A string is the vibrating element that produces sound in string instruments such as the guitar, harp, piano (piano wire), and members of the violin family. Strings are lengths of a flexible material that a musical instrument holds under tension so that they can vibrate freely, but controllably. Strings may be "plain", consisting only of a single material, like steel, nylon, or gut, or wound, having a "core" of one material and an overwinding of another. This is to make the string vibrate at the desired pitch, while maintaining a low profile and sufficient flexibility for playability.

The invention of wound strings, such as nylon covered in wound metal, was a crucial step in string instrument technology, because a metal-wound string can produce a lower pitch than a catgut string of similar thickness. This enabled stringed instruments to be made with less thick bass strings. On string instruments that the player plucks or bows directly (e.g., double bass), this enabled instrument makers to use thinner strings for the lowest-pitched strings, which made the lower-pitch strings easier to play. On stringed instruments in which the player presses a keyboard, causing a mechanism to strike the strings, such as a piano, this enabled piano builders to use shorter, thicker strings to produce the lowest-pitched bass notes, enabling the building of smaller upright pianos designed for small rooms and practice rooms.

String construction
The end of the string that mounts to the instrument's tuning mechanism (the part of the instrument that turns to tighten or loosen string tension) is usually plain. Depending on the instrument, the string's other, fixed end may have either a plain, loop, or ball end (a short brass cylinder) that attaches the string at the end opposite the tuning mechanism. When a ball or loop is used with a guitar, this ensures that the string stays fixed in the bridge of the  guitar. When a ball or loop is used with a violin-family instrument, this keeps the string end fixed in the tailpiece. Fender Bullet strings have a larger cylinder for more stable tuning on guitars equipped with synchronized tremolo systems. Strings for some instruments may be wrapped with silk at the ends to protect the string. The color and pattern of the silk often identify attributes of the string, such as manufacturer, size, intended pitch, etc.

Winding types
There are several varieties of wound strings available.

Roundwound
The simplest wound strings are roundwound—with round wire wrapped in a tight spiral around either a round or hexagonal core. Such strings are usually simple to manufacture and the least expensive. They have several drawbacks, however: 
 Roundwound strings have a bumpy surface profile (the bumps of the winding) that produce friction on the player's fingertips. This causes squeaking sounds when the player's fingers slide over the strings, especially when used on electric guitar with a guitar amplifier or with an acoustic guitar amplified through a PA system. (Some artists use this sound creatively, such as hardcore punk and heavy metal music electric guitarists who scrape the pick down the lower-pitched strings for an effect.)
 Roundwound strings' higher friction surface profile may hasten fingerboard and fret wear, compared with smoother flatwound strings.
 When the core is round, the winding is less secure and may rotate freely around the core, especially if the winding is damaged after use.

Flatwound
Flatwound strings also have either a round or hex core. However, the winding wire has a rounded square cross-section that has a shallower profile (in cross-section) when tightly wound. This makes for more comfortable playing, and decreased wear for frets and fretboards (this makes them a popular choice for fretless instruments). Squeaking sounds due to fingers sliding along the strings are also decreased significantly. Flatwound strings also have a longer playable life because of smaller grooves for dirt and oil to build up in.

On the other hand, flatwound strings sound less bright than roundwounds and tend to be harder to bend. Flatwounds also usually cost more than roundwounds because of less demand, less production, and higher overhead costs. Manufacturing is also more difficult, as precise alignment of the flat sides of the winding must be maintained (some rotation of the winding on roundwound strings is acceptable).

Modern bowed strings are plain (typically the higher-pitched, thinner strings) or flatwound, to allow smooth playing and reduce bow hair breakage. There is a niche market for roundwound fiddle strings.

Halfwound, ground wound, pressure wound
Halfwound strings, ground wound strings, or pressure wound strings are a cross between roundwound and flatwound. Such strings are usually made by winding round wire around a round or hex core first, then polishing, grinding (thus the name, ground wound) or pressing the exterior part of the winding until it is practically flat. This results in the flat, comfortable playing feel of flatwounds, along with less squeaking, with a brightness generally between roundwounds and flatwounds. The polishing process removes almost half of the winding wire's mass; thus, to compensate for it, manufacturers use winding wire of a heavier gauge. Because of the extra manufacturing process involved, they are normally more expensive than roundwounds, but less than flatwounds.

Core Types 
There are two types, or shapes, of core wire typically used in wound strings.

Hexcore
Hexcore strings are composed of hexagonal core wire and a tight (usually round) winding. Hexcore string design prevents the winding from slipping around the core – which can occur with round core strings. This may improve tuning stability, flexibility, and reduce string  breakage, compared to round core strings.

Round core
Round core strings are composed of regular round core and a tight (usually round) winding. Round core is the traditional "vintage" way of manufacturing and results in a greater contact between the winding and the core of the string.

Gauge

Bowed instrument strings, such as for the violin or cello, are usually described by tension rather than gauge. Fretted instruments (guitar, banjo, etc.) strings are usually described by gauge—the diameter of the string. The tone of a string depends partly on weight, and, therefore, on its diameter—its gauge. Usually, string manufacturers that don't describe strings by tension list string diameter in thousandths of an inch (0.001 in = 0.0254 mm). The larger the diameter, the heavier the string. Heavier strings require more tension for the same pitch and are, as a consequence, harder to press down to the fingerboard. A fretted instrument that is restrung with different string gauges may require adjustment to the string height above the frets (the "action") to maintain playing ease or keep the strings from buzzing against the frets.  The action height of fretless instruments is also adjusted to suit the string gauge or material, as well as the intended playing style.

Guitar
Steel strings for six-string guitar usually come in sets of matched strings. Sets are usually referenced either by the gauge of the first string (e.g., 9), or by pair of first and last (e.g., 9–42); measurements in thousands of an inch are the de facto standard, regardless of whether Imperial units are used in a country. Some manufacturers may have slightly different gauge sequences; the sample data below comes from D'Addario string charts for regular, round-wound, nickel-plated strings.

Electric guitar
The following table displays the gauges in inches:
(Note: strings in dark gray boxes are wound. All others are plain.)

The following table displays the gauges in millimeters:

Acoustic guitar

String gauge is subject to the personal preferences of the musician, but acoustic guitars are typically strung with a heavier gauge than electric guitars. The need for projection due to lack of amplification is one of the main reasons for this.
(Note: strings in dark gray boxes are bronze wound. All others are plain. These are for steel-string guitars, not classical nylon/gut strings. The gauge values are in inches.)

Bass guitar

Bass guitar strings are sometimes made for a particular scale length and come in short, medium, long and extra long (sometimes called super long) scale. Almost all bass guitar strings are made wound. Typical bass guitar strings come in the following gauges:

Bowed strings

Since the 20th century, with the advent of steel and synthetic core strings, most bowed instrument string makers market their strings by tension rather than by diameter. They typically make string sets in three tension levels: heavy, medium, and light (German stark, mittel, and weich). These tension levels are not standardized between manufacturers, and do not correlate to specific diameters. One brand's medium strings may have quite a different tension from another brand's medium.  Based on available historical records, gut strings were sold before 1900 in a similar way.

On the other hand, modern gut core strings with metal winding, typically have been sold either ungauged for less expensive brands, or by specific gauge.  The Gustav Pirazzi company in Germany introduced the Pirazzi meter (PM) measurement early in the 20th century. One PM equals .05 mm.  For example, a 14 1/2 PM gauge string has is .725 mm in diameter.  Pirazzi (now known as Pirastro) continues to sell its Oliv, Eudoxa, and Passione brand premium gut core strings by PM gauge.  Each string is available in 5 or more discrete gauges. Manufacturers of traditional plain gut strings, often used in historically informed performance, sell their products by light/medium/heavy, by PM, by mm or some combination.

Core materials

Steel forms the core of most metal strings. Certain keyboard instruments (e.g., harpsichord) and the Gaelic harp use brass. Other natural materials, such as silk or gut—or synthetics such as nylon and kevlar are also used for string cores. (Steel used for strings, called music wire, is hardened and tempered.) Some violin E strings are gold-plated to improve tone quality.

Steel
Steel or metal strings have become the foundation of strings for the electric guitar and bass. They have a pleasingly bright tone when compared to nylon strung guitars. Their metal composition varies greatly, sometimes using many different alloys as plating. Much of the history of metal strings evolved through innovations with the piano. In fact, the first wound metal strings ever used were used in a piano. However, when it came to getting super small diameter strings with good elastic properties, the electric guitar took the metal string to the next level adapting it for the use of pickups.

Because of the higher tension of steel strings, steel-strung guitars are more robustly made than 'classical' guitars, which use synthetic strings. Most jazz and folk string players prefer steel-core strings for their faster response, low cost, and tuning stability.

Nylon
Nylon string, traditionally used for classical music, has a more mellow tone, and the responsiveness of it can be enjoyed typically for folk but other styles of music use it as well (for example, Willie Nelson performs on a nylon strung guitar). Nylon strings are made of a softer, less dense material and are under less tension than steel strings (about 50% less). This means they can be used on older guitars that can't support the tension of modern steel strings.

Nylon strings do not work with magnetic pickups, which require ferrous strings that can interact with the magnetic field of the pickups to produce a signal.

Currently, stranded nylon is one of the most popular materials for the cores of violin, viola, cello, and double bass strings. It is often sold under the trade name of Perlon. Nylon guitar strings were first developed by Albert Augustine Strings in 1947.

Gut
The intestine, or gut, of sheep, cattle, and other animals (sometimes called catgut, though cats were never used as a source for this material) is one of the first materials used to make musical strings. In fact, the Ancient Greek word for string, "khordḗ," has "gut" as its original meaning.

Animal intestines are composed largely of elastomers, making them very flexible. But they are also extremely hygroscopic, which makes them susceptible to pitch fluctuation as a result of changing humidity. Exposure to moisture from the sweat of a musician's hands can cause plain (unwound) gut strings to fray and eventually break. This is not as much of a problem with wound gut strings, in which the gut core, being protected from contact with perspiration by the metal winding (and underlayer, if there is one), lasts a much longer time. Nonetheless, as such a gut string ages and continually responds to cyclic changes in temperature and humidity, the core becomes weak and brittle, and eventually breaks. Furthermore, all gut strings are vulnerable to going out of tune due to changes in atmospheric humidity.

However, even after the introduction of metal and synthetic core materials, many musicians still prefer to use gut strings, believing that they provide a superior tone. Players associated with the period performance movement use wound and unwound gut strings as part of an effort to recreate the sound of music of the Classical, Baroque, and Renaissance periods, as listeners would have heard it at the time of composition.

For players of plucked instruments, Nylgut strings are a recently developed alternative to gut strings. They are made from a specialty nylon and purport to offer the same acoustic properties as gut strings without the tuning problems.

Fluoropolymers (aka "Carbon") 

Fluoropolymer strings are available for classical guitar, harp, and ukulele. These strings are usually traded under descriptions like fluorocarbon, carbon fiber, or carbon, which is scientifically incorrect.

The so-called Carbon material has a higher density than nylon, so that a nylon string can be replaced by a carbon string of smaller diameter. This improves the precision of higher fretted notes, and the resulting vibrational behaviour leads to a more brilliant sound with improved harmonics. In particular, classical guitarists who feel that a nylon G string sounds too dull can use strings that include a carbon G string.

Other polymers
Other polymers, including polyetheretherketone and polybutylene terephthalate, have also been used.

Silk
Silk was extensively used in China for traditional Chinese musical instruments until replaced by metal and nylon strings in the 1950s. Only purely silk strings used for the guqin are still produced, while some silver-wound silk strings are still available for classical guitars and ukuleles. The quality in ancient times was high enough that one brand was praised as 'ice strings' for their smoothness and translucent appearance.

Winding materials 
Aluminum, silver, and chrome steel are common windings for bowed instruments like violin and viola, whereas acoustic guitar strings are usually wound with bronze and piano strings are usually wound with copper. To resist corrosion from sweat, aluminium may be used as a resistant alloy such as hydronalium. Classical guitar strings are typically nylon, with the basses being wound with either silver or bronze.  Electric guitar strings are usually wound with nickel-plated steel; pure nickel and stainless steel are also used.  Bass guitar strings are most commonly wound with stainless steel or nickel. Copper, gold, silver, and tungsten are used for some instruments. Silver and gold are more expensive and are used for their resistance to corrosion and hypoallergenicity.

Some "historically-informed" strings use an open metal winding with a "barber pole" appearance.  This practice improves the acoustic performance of heavier gauge gut strings by adding mass and making the string thinner for its tension.  Specimens of such open wound strings are known from the early 18th century, in a collection of artifacts from Antonio Stradivari. "Silk and steel" guitar strings are overwound steel strings with silk filaments under the winding.

Phosphor bronze
Phosphor bronze was introduced by D'Addario in the early 1970s. Phosphor bronze is said to keep its "new" sound longer than other strings. Small amounts of phosphorus and zinc are added to the bronze mixture. This makes the phosphor bronze slightly more corrosion resistant than 80/20 bronze.

80/20 Bronze
80/20 bronze strings are 80 percent copper and 20 percent zinc. The zinc also gives it a brighter tone, additional hardness and slows down the aging process. With additional string coating, they are preserved even more. Although, If some of the coating is applied poorly, the strings can lose their tone in just a matter of hours, and if left in high humidity can turn a hint of green because of the copper and corrode with time. The name "80/20 Bronze" is a misnomer since bronze is by definition an alloy of copper and tin. "80/20 bronze" strings would be more correctly referred to as brass.

Nickel-plated steel
Some acoustic players use strings, wound with nickel-plated-steel, meant for electric guitar. The properties of the nickel-plated strings make it a good choice for flattop guitars with sound hole-mounted magnetic pickups.

String corrosion and prevention

All metal strings are susceptible to oxidation and corrosion. Wound strings commonly use metals such as brass or bronze in their winding. These two metals are very vulnerable to corrosion. The sebaceous gland in the player's skin produces oils that can be acidic. The oils, salts, and moisture from the player's fingers are the largest source of corrosion. The composition of the oil and the oxygen in the air also helps to oxidize and corrode the strings. In steel strings the oxygen reacts with the iron in the steel and it creates rust. As a result, the string loses its brilliance over time. Water, another by-product of oxidation, increases the potential for acid corrosion in oils.  Wound strings, such as bronze acoustic strings, are very difficult to keep fresh sounding due to the lack of corrosion resistance. To help solve the corrosion problem strings are either metal plated or polymer coated. The polymer coating is claimed to reduce finger squeak and fret wear, and has better tuning capability. Some companies sell lubricating oils that slow down the oxidation process, increasing the string's life-span. These special lubricating oils are applied to the strings as a barrier to the air, to help slow the oxidation process.

Coating and plating

Some common types of metal plating on strings include tin, nickel, gold, and silver. Some metals such as gold and silver give the strings a different sound. 
Among strings coated with a polymer, (polytetrafluoroethylene) Teflon is the most commonly used. Teflon is resistant to many corrosive agents such as: chlorine, acetic acid, sulfuric acid, and hydrochloric acid. On the microscopic level Teflon has very tightly packed polymeric chains, and these tightly packed chains create a slippery surface that not only helps keep the oil from the player's hands off the strings but makes them smooth to play as well.  Ethylene tetrafluorothylene (ETFE) is another polymer that is sometimes used to coat strings. It is abrasion and cut resistant and has many characteristics similar to Teflon.

Boiling strings (guitar and bass)
Some musicians boil guitar or bass strings to rejuvenate them. The high temperature of the boiling water helps free the strings of oil, salt, and grime from the player's hands. When a string is played, very small metal shavings from fret wear may break off and lodge between the windings of the strings. Heating the strings can expand these particles and  separate them from the windings. Some players use deionized water to boil strings, believing that mineral deposits in tap water may aid corrosion of the string core. After boiling, strings may have less elasticity and be more brittle, depending on the quality of the alloys involved. Putting the strings through a cycle in the dishwasher has also been known to work.

String vibration

A string vibrates in a complex harmonic pattern. Every time the player sets a string in motion, a specific set of frequencies resonate based on the harmonic series. The fundamental frequency is the lowest, and it is determined by the density, length and tension of the string. This is the frequency we identify as the pitch of the string. Above that frequency, overtones (or harmonics) are heard, each one getting quieter the higher it is. For example, if the fundamental pitch is 440 Hz (A above middle C), the overtones for an ideal string tuned to that pitch are 880 Hz, 1320 Hz, 1760 Hz, 2200 Hz, etc. The note names for those pitches would be A, A, E, A, C, etc. Due to the physical nature of the strings, however, the higher up the overtones go, the more out of tune (or "false") they are to the fundamental. This is an important consideration for piano tuners, who try to stretch the tuning across the piano to keep overtones more in tune as they go up the keyboard.

In a phenomenon called sympathetic vibration, a string seems to vibrate by itself. This happens when sound waves strike the string at a frequency close to the string's fundamental pitch or one of its overtones. The string is connected to this similar sound wave through the air, which picks up the vibrations of the sound waves at the same frequency, and in turn causes the string to vibrate on its own. When an outside source applies forced vibration that matches a string's natural frequency, the string vibrates.

Resonance can cause audio feedback. For example, in a setup with an acoustic guitar and a PA system, the speaker vibrates at the same natural frequency of a string on the guitar and can force it into vibrational motion. Audio feedback is often seen as an undesirable phenomenon with an acoustic guitar that is plugged into the PA system, because it causes a loud howling sound. However, with electric guitar, some guitarists in heavy metal music and psychedelic rock purposely create feedback by holding an electric guitar close to a powerful, loud guitar amplifier speaker cabinet, with the distortion turned up loud, creating unique high-pitched, sustained sounds. Jimi Hendrix and Brian May were notable users of electric guitar feedback.

For a typical high-E nylon string, the maximum transverse force is roughly 40 times greater than the maximum longitudinal force amplitude. However, the longitudinal force increases with the square of the pulse amplitude, so the differences diminish with increasing amplitude. The elastic (Young's) modulus for steel is about 40 times greater than for nylon, and string tensions are about 50% greater, so the longitude and transverse force amplitudes are nearly equal.

Tensile properties
Tuning a stringed instrument such as a guitar to pitch puts the strings under a large amount of strain, which indicates the amount of stress inside the string. Stress is relative to the stretch or elongation of the strings. As the string is tuned to a higher pitch, it gets longer and thinner. The instrument can go out of tune because if it has been stretched past its elastic limit, it will not recover its original tension. On a stress vs. strain curve, there is a linear region where stress and strain are related called Young's modulus. A newer set of strings will often be in a region on the stress vs. strain curve past the Young's modulus called the plastic region. In the plastic region, plastic deformation occurs—deformation the material cannot recover from. Thus, in the plastic region, the relationship is not linear (Young's modulus is no longer a constant). The elastic region is where elastic deformation is occurring, or deformation from where the string can recover. The linear (i.e. elastic) region is where musicians want to play their instrument.

See also
Violin construction and mechanics
Electronic tuner
Harmonic oscillator

References

External links

Videos explaining differences among guitar strings 
Identify strings by their silk patterns
The vibrations of strings with both ends fixed 
Guitar Strings From The Nineteenth Century To The Advent Of Nylon
How to Change the Strings on a Fender Stratocaster
How to Choose Which Strings To Use On Your Guitar
 String Calculation; String Measurement; Mass Per Unit Length
String Tension – technical information on string tension, with tension calculator

String instruments
Musical instrument parts and accessories